Wit Busza is an American physicist, born in Romania and of Polish descent. He is a professor in physics at the Massachusetts Institute of Technology (MIT). He obtained a B.Sc. (1960) and Ph.D. (1964) from University College London. He began teaching at MIT in 1969 and was appointed as full professor in 1979. He was named a Margaret MacVicar Faculty Fellow in 1995. He is a member of the Polish Academy of Arts and Sciences and a fellow of the American Physical Society.

Research interests 
Busza's studies are primarily in the field of quark–gluon plasma. He has been the spokesperson of the PHOBOS experiment at the Relativistic Heavy Ion Collider. PHOBOS has the largest pseudorapidity coverage of all detectors and is tailored for bulk particle multiplicity measurement.

Awards
 Buechner Prize for Outstanding Contributions to the MIT Physics Education Program (1990)
 MIT School of Science Prize for Excellence in Undergraduate Teaching (1993)

References

External links 
 Wit Busza Interview - Special Topic of Hadron Colliders

Living people
Year of birth missing (living people)
21st-century American physicists
Massachusetts Institute of Technology School of Science faculty
Members of the Polish Academy of Learning
Fellows of the American Physical Society